The Canoo Lifestyle Vehicle is a battery electric minivan announced by Canoo. Four models have been announced, with range estimates of 400 kilometers (250 mi) and an estimated 0–100 km/h (0–62 mph) time of 6.3 seconds.

The base price of the vehicle is announced to be US$34,750. Production of the Lifestyle Vehicle is stated to begin in late 2022.

Design 
The Canoo Lifestyle Vehicle will be available in four trims. The Delivery trim, priced US$34,750, would offer two seats and 1464 lbs (664 kg) of cargo capacity. The Base trim would be able to sit 5 persons. The Premium trim, priced $49,950, would offer 7 seats with two additional seats mounted longitudinally on the rear doors, a glass roof, a front street view window, a 17 speakers audio system, ambient lighting and an ultraviolet air purifying system. The Adventure trim would add an exclusive paint color, a tow hitch and roof rack.

Specifications 
The Canoo Lifestyle Vehicle (LV) would be built on a chassis integrating the battery and driving elements in a single "skateboard". Suspensions would use a double wishbone with a transverse composite leaf spring.

The LV would be equipped with a drive-by-wire system, eliminating the need for mechanical connections like a steering shaft and allowing for a greater flexibility in designing the cabin. The body would be a steel structure covered by plastic panels.

The battery is to use 2170 cylindrical lithium-ion cells manufactured by Panasonic and integrated into the chassis in eight structural battery modules.

Production 
Lifestyle Vehicles will be assembled in factories to be built in Arkansas and Pryor, Oklahoma. As of 2022, Canoo aims to build at least 3,000 vehicles in 2022, then 14,000 in 2023 and 40,000 in 2024 and 70,000 in 2025.

References 

Electric vehicles
Minivans